Shahganj is a constituency of the Uttar Pradesh Legislative Assembly covering the city of Shahganj in the Jaunpur district of Uttar Pradesh, India.

Shahganj is one of five assembly constituencies in the Jaunpur Lok Sabha constituency. Since 2008, this assembly constituency is numbered 365 amongst 403 constituencies.

Election results

2022

2017
Samajwadi Party candidate Shailendra Yadav Lalai, won in the 2017 Uttar Pradesh Legislative Elections defeating Suheldev Bharatiya Samaj Party candidate Rana Ajeet Pratap Singh by a margin of 9,162 votes.

References

External links
 

Assembly constituencies of Uttar Pradesh
Politics of Jaunpur district